The 2000 Anzac test was a rugby league test match played between Australia and New Zealand at the Sydney Olympic Stadium 27 April 2000. It was the 4th Anzac test played between the two nations since the first was played under the Super League banner in 1997 and the third to be played in Sydney.

Squads

Match Summary

References

2000 in Australian rugby league
2000 in New Zealand rugby league
Anzac Test
International rugby league competitions hosted by Australia
Rugby league in Sydney